IDM may refer to:

Science and information
 Identity management, the management of the identity life cycle of an entity
 Novell Identity Manager software, now called NetIQ Identity Manager
 Integrated data management
 Integrated document management
 Integrated device manufacturer, a type of semiconductor company which designs, manufactures, and sells integrated circuit products
 Integrated Direct Metering, a real-time TTL metering method for ambient and flashlight employed by the Pentax LX
 Intelligent device management, a type of enterprise software applications
 Intelligent driver model, a microscopic traffic flow model
 Internet Download Manager, a closed source software download manager

Organizations
 IDM (ISP), also known as IncoNet-Data Management S.A.L., an internet service provider
 IDM Computer Solutions, creators of the UltraEdit text editor
 Impact Direct Ministries, a non-profit organization
 Institute for Disease Modeling, epidemiological research organization in Bellevue, Washington

Music
 Intelligent dance music, a subgenre of electronic music
 Industrial dance music, a fusion of industrial and electronic dance music

Other uses
 Intelligent design movement, a religious campaign promoting the pseudoscientific idea of intelligent design
 Infant of a diabetic mother, in medicine